Surgeon Vice Admiral Sir John Stuart Pepys Rawlins,  (12 May 1922 – 27 July 2011) was a Royal Navy officer and pioneer in the field of diving medicine.

Royal Navy
Rawlins was the son of Colonel Stuart Rawlins. He was educated at Wellington College, read medicine at University College, Oxford and trained at Barts, graduating in 1945. Soon after, Rawlins began his career as a surgeon lieutenant Royal Navy Volunteer Reserve officer and was assigned to the Colossus class aircraft carrier  in 1947. After transitioning from the reserves to active duty in 1951, Rawlins was assigned to the RAF Institute of Aviation Medicine (IAM). He was appointed a Member of the Order of the British Empire in 1955 for his work with protective helmets, and was promoted to the rank of surgeon commander while he continued his research at the IAM until 1961. That year he was advanced to Officer of the Order of the British Empire for his work on the automatic underwater escape system. Rawlins was also a member of the US Navy SEALAB project.

Rawlins served as the RN Director of Health and Research from 1975 to 1977 and later as the RN Medical Director General from 1977 to 1980 when he retired as surgeon vice admiral.

Other honours
In 1971, Rawlins also served as the first "past president" on the founding executive committee for the European Underwater and Baromedical Society.

The Gilbert Blane Medal of the Royal College of Surgeons was awarded in 1974 for his work on cold in diving. Rawlins was a British Sub-Aqua Club Honorary Life Member as well as President of the Historical Diving Society and the Association of RN First Class Divers. He received the Lowell Thomas Award from The Explorers Club in 2000.

References

External links

 Obituary in The Times
 Obituary in The Telegraph

1922 births
2011 deaths
Military personnel from Wiltshire
British medical researchers
British underwater divers
Royal Navy vice admirals
Royal Navy Medical Service officers
Fellows of the Royal Aeronautical Society
Fellows of the Royal College of Physicians
Knights Commander of the Order of the British Empire
People educated at Wellington College, Berkshire
Alumni of University College, Oxford
20th-century Royal Navy personnel